Ronald Katarina Martinus Waterreus (born 25 August 1970) is a Dutch former footballer who played as a goalkeeper. He notably played for PSV Eindhoven and Rangers, before ending his career at New York Red Bulls in the Major League Soccer.

Club career
Born in Lemiers, Limburg, Waterreus started his career in 1992, playing for Roda JC. After joining PSV Eindhoven in 1994 he quickly established himself as one of the best goalkeepers in the Eredivisie, eventually being selected for the Dutch national squad.

After ten seasons as PSV's number one goalkeeper, Waterreus was transferred to Manchester City for one season. He joined SPL side Rangers in 2005 as cover for the injured Stefan Klos, however he quickly established himself as Rangers' first choice goalkeeper. He was also involved in Rangers' historic 2005–06 Champions League run where they reached the knock-out stage for the first time. Waterreus, however, eventually came under fire from Rangers fans following his criticism of the club in a Dutch newspaper, which was misinterpreted by the fans as a result of poor journalism. Waterreus left Rangers on 7 June 2006 having failed to agree a new contract.

He signed a short-term contract  with AZ Alkmaar on 4 December 2006, replacing the injured Joey Didulica and Khalid Sinouh in the month of December. In January 2007, he left the club again and agreed to move to New York Red Bulls in Major League Soccer, where he immediately established himself with three clean sheets and another scoreless half to set the record for longest clean sheet streak to begin an MLS career.

International career
Waterreus was on the Dutch national squad at Euro 2004 but he did not get any playing time. He altogether made seven appearances for his country.

Honours
Eredivisie 1996-1997, 1999-2000, 2000-2001 & 2002-2003

KNVB Cup 1995-1996

Johan Cruyff Shield (Super Cup) 1997, 1998, 1999, 2001, 2002 & 2004

Scottish Premier League 2004–05 

Scottish League Cup 2004–05

References

External links

Yahoo sport profile
 

1970 births
Living people
People from Vaals
Expatriate footballers in England
Expatriate footballers in Scotland
Dutch association football commentators
Dutch expatriate footballers
Dutch footballers
Netherlands international footballers
Association football goalkeepers
PSV Eindhoven players
Manchester City F.C. players
Rangers F.C. players
AZ Alkmaar players
New York Red Bulls players
UEFA Euro 2004 players
Scottish Premier League players
Eredivisie players
Major League Soccer players
Expatriate soccer players in the United States
Major League Soccer All-Stars
Footballers from Limburg (Netherlands)
Dutch expatriate sportspeople in England
Dutch expatriate sportspeople in Scotland
Dutch expatriate sportspeople in the United States